The Leadership Foundation for Higher Education (LFHE) was an organisation in the United Kingdom providing support and advice on leadership, governance and management for higher education, based in Holborn, London. It was merged into Advance HE in 2018.

History
The organisation was established in 2004 by the UUK and SCOP (now known as GuildHE). It took over the function of the Higher Education Staff Development Agency (HESDA), based in Ingram House in Sheffield. It was incorporated as a company in October 2003, and registered as a charity in February 2004.

In March 2018, LFHE merged with the Equality Challenge Unit and the Higher Education Academy to form Advance HE.

Structure
It was situated in Holborn off the Grays Inn Road, near Chancery Lane tube station. It was funded by the four higher education funding bodies of the Higher Education Funding Council for England: Scottish Funding Council; Higher Education Funding Council for Wales; and the Department for Employment and Learning, Northern Ireland.

The Leadership Foundation was a membership organisation and in 2014–15 there were 152 universities and higher education colleges in membership.

Function
The Leadership Foundation delivered its work through programmes and events; institutional advice and consultancy and providing research on leadership, management and governance for higher education institutions. It cooperated with a wide range of organisations and associations to do this.

Notable people
 Fiona Ross, Director of Research

See also

 National College for School Leadership – a similar organisation for schools

References

External links
 Official website

2004 establishments in England
Educational administration
Educational institutions disestablished in 2018
Higher education organisations based in the United Kingdom